Diformylcresol is an organic compound with the formula CH3C6H2(CHO)2OH.  The 2,6-diformyl derivative of p-cresol is the most common isomer and is a white solid at room temperature.

Diformylcresol condenses with amines to give diimines that are widely studied as binucleating ligands.

Synthesis
Formyl groups (aldehydes) are fairly strong deactivating groups for electrophilic aromatic substitution reactions, hence double-addition to a phenol requires forcing conditions. Diformylcresol may be prepared from p-cresol by the Reimer-Tiemann reaction or the Duff reaction.

The corresponding reaction of phenol would be expected to lead to formylation of the 4-position vs 2,6-selectivity.

Related compounds
salicylaldehyde, a phenol with only one flanking formyl group

References 

Aromatic aldehydes
Phenols